Orust is an island in western Sweden, and Sweden's third largest island. In 2014 Statistics Sweden declared it to instead be the fourth largest island, under a definition which adds artificial canals to the possible bodies of water surrounding an island. It has been noted that under this definition, all of Götaland would be the country's largest island, rendering Orust instead the fifth largest. The largest town on Orust is Henån, the municipal capital, where approximately 1,800 inhabitants live. Other communities, many of which are fishing villages, include Ellös, Edshultshall, Hälleviksstrand, Mollösund, Morlanda, Stocken, Svanesund, Svanvik and Varekil. Orust is home to approximately 15,160 inhabitants in the winter and many more in the summer. Its main industry is the shipyards, the two largest being Najadvarvet and Hallberg-Rassy.

International relations

Twin towns – Sister cities
Orust is twinned with:
 Aalborg, Denmark

See also
Orust Municipality
Orust Eastern Hundred
Orust Western Hundred
Haga dolmen

References

External links

Orust Municipality - Official site

Islands of Västra Götaland County
Islands on the Swedish West Coast